The 1990 Budweiser 500 was the 11th stock car race of the 1990 NASCAR Winston Cup Series season and the 22nd iteration of the event. The race was held on Sunday, June 3, 1990, before an audience of 77,000 in Dover, Delaware at Dover Downs International Speedway, a 1-mile (1.6 km) permanent oval-shaped racetrack. The race took the scheduled 500 laps to complete. In the late stages of the race, Whitcomb Racing driver Derrike Cope would make a late-race charge to the front, passing for the lead with 55 laps to go to take his second and to date, final career NASCAR Winston Cup Series victory and his second and final victory of the season. To fill out the top three, Hendrick Motorsports driver Ken Schrader and Cale Yarborough Motorsports driver Dick Trickle would finish second and third, respectively.

In the driver's championship standings, Bud Moore Engineering driver Morgan Shepherd would take the overall lead after a poor finish from then-points leader Dale Earnhardt.

Background 

Dover Downs International Speedway is an oval race track in Dover, Delaware, United States that has held at least two NASCAR races since it opened in 1969. In addition to NASCAR, the track also hosted USAC and the NTT IndyCar Series. The track features one layout, a 1-mile (1.6 km) concrete oval, with 24° banking in the turns and 9° banking on the straights. The speedway is owned and operated by Dover Motorsports.

The track, nicknamed "The Monster Mile", was built in 1969 by Melvin Joseph of Melvin L. Joseph Construction Company, Inc., with an asphalt surface, but was replaced with concrete in 1995. Six years later in 2001, the track's capacity moved to 135,000 seats, making the track have the largest capacity of sports venue in the mid-Atlantic. In 2002, the name changed to Dover International Speedway from Dover Downs International Speedway after Dover Downs Gaming and Entertainment split, making Dover Motorsports. From 2007 to 2009, the speedway worked on an improvement project called "The Monster Makeover", which expanded facilities at the track and beautified the track. After the 2014 season, the track's capacity was reduced to 95,500 seats.

Entry list 

 (R) denotes rookie driver.

Qualifying 
Qualifying was split into two rounds. The first round was held on Friday, June 1, at 3:00 PM EST. Each driver would have one lap to set a time. During the first round, the top 20 drivers in the round would be guaranteed a starting spot in the race. If a driver was not able to guarantee a spot in the first round, they had the option to scrub their time from the first round and try and run a faster lap time in a second round qualifying run, held on Saturday, June 2, at 11:30 AM EST. As with the first round, each driver would have one lap to set a time. For this specific race, positions 21-40 would be decided on time, and depending on who needed it, a select amount of positions were given to cars who had not otherwise qualified but were high enough in owner's points; up to two provisionals were given.

No drivers would fail to qualify.

Full qualifying results

Race results

Standings after the race 

Drivers' Championship standings

Note: Only the first 10 positions are included for the driver standings.

References 

1990 NASCAR Winston Cup Series
NASCAR races at Dover Motor Speedway
June 1990 sports events in the United States
1990 in sports in Delaware